Onegin stanza (Russian: онегинская строфа oneginskaya strofa), sometimes "Pushkin sonnet", refers to the verse form  popularized (or invented) by the Russian poet Alexander Pushkin through his 1825-1832 novel in verse Eugene Onegin.  The work was mostly written in verses of iambic tetrameter with the rhyme scheme , where the lowercase letters represent feminine rhymes (stressed on the penultimate syllable) and the uppercase representing masculine rhymes (stressed on the ultimate syllable). For example, here is the first stanza of Onegin as rendered into English by Charles Johnston:
     My uncle—high ideals inspire him;
     but when past joking he fell sick,
     he really forced one to admire him—
     and never played a shrewder trick.
     Let others learn from his example!
     But God, how deadly dull to sample
     sickroom attendance night and day
     and never stir a foot away!
     And the sly baseness, fit to throttle,
     of entertaining the half-dead:
     one smoothes the pillows down in bed,
     and glumly serves the medicine bottle,
     and sighs, and asks oneself all through:
     "When will the devil come for you?"
Like the Shakespearean sonnet, the Onegin stanza may be divided into three quatrains and a closing couplet (normally without stanza breaks or indentations), and it has a total of seven rhymes, rather than the four or five rhymes of the Petrarchan sonnet. Because the second quatrain (lines 5-8) consists of two independent couplets, the poet may introduce a strong thematic break after line 6, which is not feasible in Petrarchan or Shakespearian sonnets.

In Russian poetry following Pushkin, the form has been utilized by authors as diverse as Mikhail Lermontov, Vyacheslav Ivanov, Jurgis Baltrušaitis and Valery Pereleshin, in genres ranging from one-stanza lyrical piece to voluminous autobiography. Nevertheless, the Onegin stanza, being easily recognisable, is strongly identified as belonging to its creator, and its use in œuvres of any kind implicitly triggers a reading of the particular text against the backdrop of Pushkin's imagery and worldview.

John Fuller's 1980 "The Illusionists" and Jon Stallworthy's 1987 "The Nutcracker" used this stanza form, and Vikram Seth's 1986 novel The Golden Gate is written wholly in Onegin stanzas. 

The Onegin stanza is also used in the verse novel Equinox by Australian writer Matthew Rubinstein, serialized daily in the Sydney Morning Herald and currently awaiting publication; in the biography in verse Richard Burgin by Diana Burgin; in the verse novel Jack the Lady Killer by HRF Keating (title borrowed from a line in Golden Gate in Onegin stanza rhymes but not always preserving the metric pattern); in several poems by Australian poet Gwen Harwood, for instance the first part of "Class of 1927" and "Sea Eagle" (the first employs a humorous Byronic tone, but the second adapts the stanza to a spare lyrical mood, which is good evidence of the form's versatility); and in the verse novel "Unholyland" by Aidan Andrew Dun. The British writer Andy Croft has written two novels in Onegin stanzas, "Ghost Writer" and "1948". In addition, Brad Walker used the form for his 2019 novella, "Adam and Rosamond", a parody of Victorian fiction.

Some stanzaic forms, written in iambic tetrameter in the poetry of Vladimír Holan, especially in the poems První testament and Cesta mraku, were surely inspired by Onegin stanza.

References

External links
Tetrameter.com A website featuring work written in tetrameter by various poets
On Translating Eugene Onegin A poem by Vladimir Nabokov written in Onegin Stanzas
Selections from The Golden Gate

Stanzaic form
Russian poetry
Sonnet studies
Alexander Pushkin

ja:ソネット#オネーギン・スタンザ